Botswana Cricket Association (BCA) Oval is a sporting venue in Gaborone, Botswana, consisting of two separate cricket grounds (Oval 1 and Oval 2) in the vicinity of the University of Botswana Stadium. The grounds have been host to various ICC tournaments like 2011 ICC World Cricket League Division Seven as well as 2013 ICC World Cricket League Division Seven. The BCA Ovals also hosted the 2021 ICC Women's T20 World Cup Africa Qualifier.

There are three grounds in Botswana. The Botswana Cricket Association Oval 2 is the smaller ground and is located next to Botswana Cricket Association Oval 1. BCA Oval 1 is main ground along with Lobatse Cricket Ground.

References

External links 

 Botswana Cricket Association Oval 1 cricketarchive
 Botswana Cricket Association Oval 2 cricketarchive
 Botswana Cricket Association Oval 1  cricinfo
 Botswana Cricket Association Oval 2  cricinfo
 Official Website

Cricket grounds in Botswana
Sports venues in Botswana
Sport in Botswana
Sports venues in Gaborone